Operation Eagle Eye was a Republican Party voter suppression operation in the 1960s in Arizona to challenge minority voters. In the United States only citizens have ever been able to vote, and in 1964 only literate citizens could vote, so it was legal to ensure that (1) a potential voter was literate, and (2) a potential voter was a United States Citizen.  Through the employment of literacy tests, oral demands to interpret the United States Constitution and detailed questions about a potential voter's origins and how long the potential voter had been in the United States, Republican workers would challenge minority voters, especially those with broken English. William Rehnquist, later chief justice of the Supreme Court of the United States, is said to have been the head of a group of lawyers hoping to challenge voters in minority Democratic precincts.  Operation Eagle Eye was a two-year effort, and the laws in Arizona have since made this kind of challenge illegal.

Precursor to Operation Eagle Eye (1954-1962) 
Beginning in the early 1950s and 60s, it became popular for politicians to appeal to Southern whites through racially charged campaign messages. Many succeeding Republican candidates and almost all Republican presidents made racial appeals – some subtle, some otherwise – to southern whites still angry at federal abolition of the Jim Crow system. This became known as the ‘Southern Strategy’. Democratic President Lyndon B. Johnson’s overwhelming popularity in the polls at the time – just a year in after taking office in the aftermath of Kennedy’s assassination – and his relentless talk of civil rights and voting rights heightened Republican National Committee concerns and swung the door wide open for voter suppression strategies of all kinds. It was in this context that the infamous Operation Eagle Eye was born. As shameful and un-American as it was, RNC’s goal was simple – to develop a strategy around voter suppression to win elections – and it has been effective. Many now believe that the 1958 ballot security program implemented in Arizona was the precursor to Operation Eagle Eye and the blueprint for which it was designed.

Operation Eagle Eye Launches (1964) 
The Republican National Committee announced its plan to conduct a nationwide ballot security program entitled "Operation Eagle Eye" in 1964. It was to be employed in the presidential election between Barry Goldwater and President Lyndon B. Johnson. 

At the time, Operation Eagle Eye was virtually unknown but a highly organized and financed effort by the Republican party to suppress minority voting. The RNC insisted it was necessary to protect the integrity of the American ballot and against voter fraud. "OEE" became the nation's first large-scale anti-voter fraud campaign where the Republican National Committee recruited tens of thousands of volunteers to show up at polling places, mostly in inner-cities, to challenge voter eligibility. In particular, whether the voter was able to read since literacy was a requirement to vote. The recruited poll watchers used a variety of tactics, including asking voters to read a portion of the Constitution, cameras, two-way radios, and calls to Republican-friendly sheriffs. This attempt to thwart electoral fraud by challenging voters at the polls only served to intimidate minorities and swing elections in favor of Republicans.

Future Supreme Court Justice William Rehnquist was a prominent figure during the years of Operation Eagle Eye. He was a poll watcher with direct involvement in challenging voters at the polls as early as 1958.  Years later during Rehnquist's Senate confirmation hearings to become Chief Justice, a US District Attorney in Phoenix at the time testified that he had seen Rehnquist challenging black and hispanic voters at precincts in South Phoenix.  Rehnquist denied any such involvement. However, his association with OEE remained a stain on his reputation despite being confirmed as Chief Justice in 1986.

Another key figure in Operation Eagle Eye was Charles Barr, its National Director. He was responsible for employing "100,000 poll-watchers with the objective of challenging over a million voters",however, he denied any discriminatory practices.

1964 Ballot Security Program Initiatives

The General Outline of the 1964 Ballot Security Program included the following instructions:

 Create in each state an effective Ballot Security Organization under leadership of the State Ballot Security Officer.
 Research and study State Election Laws, irregularities and errors, and how to combat and correct.
 Attend national educational conferences for Ballot Security Officers.
 Observe and report pre-election violations.
 Recruit and train poll watchers and challengers, where permitted, to secure each precinct.
 Appoint qualified and true Republicans as election officials in each precinct. Determine that registration is being properly conducted.
 Strive to improve canvassing methods to identify unqualified, non-existent voters and eliminate them from the lists.
 Plan, schedule, supervise and teach training courses designed to eliminate fraud and error for Republican election officials, watchers, and challengers.
 Prepare and distribute materials and check lists for study and reference by precinct officials.
 Focus press attention on the problem and program.
 Secure effective cooperation of law enforcement officials.
 Set up an Election Day security network to advise and act on ballot irregularity matters.
 Collect information in the event of prosecution or other proceedings following an election.
 Determine that ballots and machines are safeguarded after the election.
 Develop new plans and ideas to improve future operations by Ballot Security Officers, considering possible legislative amendments to improve the election laws for future elections.

How Operation Eagle Eye Worked 

Purging Voter Lists Through Vote Caging - Typically a method of purging voters lists, voter caging consists of sending mail to addresses on the voter registration polls and counting the number of returned or undelivered pieces of mail. This becomes the basis for purging the voter list. This is unreliable because mail can be returned for any number of reasons. However, in 1964, Eagle Eye supporters challenged 1.8 million voters' eligibility with this tactic.
Distribution of Deterrent Paraphernalia - Eagle Eye supporters also sent misleading or deceptive mailers to the voter lists. Some examples of this voter intimidation were mailers indicating a voter who had committed a traffic violation, etc. would be arrested after voting, or anonymous calls to minority voters telling them they would be harassed at the polls. The most offensive was encouraging minority voters to write-in Dr. Martin Luther King's name for president knowing this would nullify their votes.
The Deployment of Poll Watchers to Challenge Voters on Election Day - Challenging voters at the polls could happen in a number of ways. They could be asked humiliating questions, demanded to show citizenship papers, or asked to show proof they could read. Voters were challenged if they appeared on the purged voters list.

Psychological deterrence was a significant aspect of the OEE efforts. The Republican strategy attempted to discourage illegitimate voters from committing fraud by simply creating the appearance that they were being watched. It was for this reason that RNC leaders also encouraged poll watchers to bring cameras.

Political Legacy of Operation Eagle Eye (1970s - Present) 
In 1964, the Republican, Barry Goldwater suffered a stunning defeat. And although President Johnson won the election by a wide margin, out of Operation Eagle Eye emerged a frightening concept:"Some of the methods employed by Eagle Eye became part of the modus operandi of subsequent Republican campaigns. These include challenging of Democratic voters at polls without cause, humiliation of uneducated voters, efforts to slow down voting in Democratic precincts, special targeting of minority, low-income neighborhoods for challenges and developing an attitude among ballot security teams that encourages stereotyping low-income and minority voters as venal and stupid."After Operation Eagle Eye, literacy tests were challenged by the state of Arizona and the federal government instituted a ban on the requirement.

The Operation's Enduring Legacy 
The footprint for OEE has endured for decades and the effects are still felt to this day. At the time OEE was launched, immigration was not a prominent issue because Latinos in Arizona "knew their place". Now immigration has taken a larger role in politics and discourages minorities from voting in border states. Similar OEE tactics are still being employed against Latinos in fear of deportation.

As of February 2014, there were 31 states with laws requiring some form of identification at the polls, while others are still pending court challenges. Instead of mobilizing voters, the Republican South has led a new charge for restrictive voting laws in response to changing demographics, and ideological shifts among the party. In addition to Operation Eagle Eye style voter suppression, voter caging, intimidation and dissemination of false voting information, the new Republican party has also had to respond to recent allegations of gerrymandering.

References

Political history of Arizona
Voter suppression
Suffrage organisations in the United States
Republican Democratic Movement politicians